Éghezée is a municipality of Wallonia located in the province of Namur, Belgium. 

On 1 January 2010 the municipality had 15,169 inhabitants. The total area is 102.81 km2, giving a population density of 146.93 inhabitants per km2.

The municipality consists of the following districts: Aische-en-Refail, Bolinne, Boneffe, Branchon, Dhuy, Éghezée, Hanret, Leuze, Liernu, Longchamps, Mehaigne, Noville-sur-Mehaigne, Saint-Germain, Taviers, Upigny, and Waret-la-Chaussée.

See also
 List of protected heritage sites in Eghezée

References

External links
 
Official website (in French)

Municipalities of Namur (province)